Eucalyptus cerasiformis, commonly known as the cherry-fruited mallee, is a mallee that is endemic to a small area of Western Australia. It has smooth, pale grey, sometimes powdery bark, lance-shaped adult leaves, flower buds in groups of seven, pale yellow or whitish flowers and cylindrical or bell-shaped fruit.

Description
The adult leaves are thin and the same glossy, grey-green on both sides. Flowering occurs between December and March and the flowers are pale yellow or whitish. The fruit is a woody cylindrical, bell-shaped, urn-shaped or hemispherical capsule.

Taxonomy and naming
The description was published in the journal Nuytsia. The specific epithet (cerasiformis) is derived from the Latin cerasus meaning "cherry-tree" and -formis meaning "shape", referring to the hanging flower buds resembling a bunch of cherries.

Distribution and habitat
Cherry-fruited mallee is only known from the type location, just north of Lake Johnston where it grows in low, open forest in red-loamy soils.

Conservation status
This eucalypt is classified as "Priority Four" by the Government of Western Australia Department of Parks and Wildlife, meaning that is rare or near threatened.

See also
List of Eucalyptus species

References

Eucalypts of Western Australia
Trees of Australia
cerasiformis
Myrtales of Australia
Plants described in 1978
Taxa named by Ian Brooker